Giovanni Angelo Arcimboldi (1485–1555) was a Roman Catholic prelate who served as  
Bishop of Novara (1526–1550)
and
Archbishop of Milan (1550–1555).

Biography
Giovanni Angelo Arcimboldi was born in Milan, Italy on 27 September 1485.
On 2 March 1526, he was appointed during the papacy of Pope Clement VII as Bishop of Novara.
On 22 May 1526, he was consecrated bishop by Antonio Maria Ciocchi del Monte, Cardinal-Bishop of Porto e Santa Rufina, with Giovanni Maria Ciocchi del Monte, Archbishop of Manfredonia, and Bernardo Ruggieri, Bishop of Sora, serving as co-consecrators. 
On 19 March 1550, he was appointed during the papacy of Pope Julius III as Archbishop of Milan.
He served as Archbishop of Milan until his death on 6 April 1555.

Episcopal succession
While bishop, he was the principal consecrator of:
Francesco Bernardino Simonetta, Bishop of Perugia (1540); and 
Martín Pérez de Ayala, Bishop of Guadix (1548).

References

External links and additional sources
 (for Chronology of Bishops) 
 (for Chronology of Bishops) 

16th-century Italian Roman Catholic archbishops
Bishops appointed by Pope Clement VII
Bishops appointed by Pope Julius III
1485 births
1555 deaths